Ujima Radio broadcasts on 98.0 FM across the City of Bristol within a 3 mile (5 Kilometre) radius of St Pauls.

Change of ownership and commitments 
Launched in 2008, Ujima Radio changed ownership in 2010 to Ujima CIC with a new management structure, after its parent company CEED went into receivership.

In 2013, Ujima Radio revised its commitment to Ofcom.

Programming 
The station provides a popular and accessible range of programmes designed specifically to meet the needs of the African-Caribbean community in the specified areas of Bristol. A broad spectrum of appeal ensures strong community support and participation. This includes news, arts and cultural programmes made by the community for the community. Plus training in radio production and media skills to support people living in areas of high deprivation, many of whom have been excluded from school and whom are Not in Education, Employment or Training.

Ujima Radio and BCFM joined forces in 2013 to launch the One Love Breakfast Show, a joint venture which broadcasts across both stations during weekdays, and in the same year was awarded ‘The Best Idea Into Action Award’ from VOSCUR.

Awards 

Ujima Radio has also reached the shortlist for the Community Development Project of the Year section in the 2018 Community Radio Awards.

Change of premises 
Ujima Radio first opened its doors at Ujima House on Wilder Street in St Pauls, Bristol in 2008. After CEED went into receivership, Ujima Radio moved to The Station on Silver Street, Broadmead.

References

External links
 
 Ujima Radio player

Radio stations in Bristol
Culture_in_Bristol